NGC 1274 is a compact elliptical galaxy located about 280 million light-years away in the constellation Perseus. NGC 1274 was discovered by astronomer Lawrence Parsons on December 4, 1875. It is a member of the Perseus Cluster.

See also
 List of NGC objects (1001–2000)

References

External links
 

Perseus Cluster
Perseus (constellation)
Elliptical galaxies
1274
12413
Astronomical objects discovered in 1875
Discoveries by Lawrence Parsons